Under Maryland law for the election for the 1st and 2nd Congresses "candidates were elected at-large but had to be residents of a specific district with the statewide vote determining winners from each district."

See also 
 United States House of Representatives elections, 1790 and 1791
 List of United States representatives from Maryland

References 

1790
United States House of Representatives
Maryland